Jairo Andrés Suárez Carvajal (born March 24, 1985) is a Colombian retired footballer.

Career
Born in Bogotá, Suárez began playing football with Santa Fe. He made his professional debut for Santa Fe with a substitute's appearance against Millonarios in July 2002.

Usually a central defender, he has played almost his whole career at Santa Fe. In 2014, he joined the Indian Super League team Chennaiyin FC. He played for Colombia in the 2005 Sub 20 World Cup qualifiers.

References

1985 births
Living people
Footballers from Bogotá
Colombian footballers
Colombia international footballers
Colombian expatriate footballers
Categoría Primera A players
Independiente Santa Fe footballers
América de Cali footballers
La Equidad footballers
Cúcuta Deportivo footballers
Fortaleza C.E.I.F. footballers
Chennaiyin FC players
Colombian expatriate sportspeople in India
Expatriate footballers in India
Association football defenders